Ricardo Miguel dos Santos Lopes Ramires, known as Ramires (born 22 March 1976) is a Portuguese former professional footballer who played as a midfielder.

He played six seasons and 132 games in the Primeira Liga for Alverca and Vitória Guimarães.

Club career
Ramires made his Primeira Liga debut for Vitória Guimarães on 30 September 1995 in a game against Salgueiros.

Honours
Portugal U18
UEFA European Under-18 Championship: 1994

References

External links
 

1976 births
Footballers from Lisbon
Living people
Portuguese footballers
Association football midfielders
Portugal B international footballers
Portugal under-21 international footballers
Portugal youth international footballers
Primeira Liga players
Liga Portugal 2 players
Luxembourg National Division players
S.C.U. Torreense players
Vitória S.C. players
F.C. Alverca players
C.D. Santa Clara players
Imortal D.C. players
Zamora CF footballers
FC RM Hamm Benfica players
Portuguese expatriate footballers
Portuguese expatriate sportspeople in Spain
Expatriate footballers in Spain
Portuguese expatriate sportspeople in Luxembourg
Expatriate footballers in Luxembourg